Raymond Chabanne (27 March 1924 – 3 June 2022) was a French military officer who achieved the rank of général. He was commanding officer of the 3rd Marine Infantry Parachute Regiment from 1972 to 1974.

Biography
Chabanne was born in Clermont-Ferrand in 1924. He left the Compagnons in March 1942 and enlisted in the Free French Forces.

After World War II, he graduated from the École militaire interarmes and earned a parachuting certificate from the École de l'infanterie.

Here, he met Captain Marcel Bigeard at the Hôtel Métropole. He once again returned to France in 1954 before deployment to Bône in August 1955 to fight in the Algerian War.

On 13 May 1958, he was sent to Constantine, where he created the Commando Parachute Group. He was then sent to Aïn Séfra and later Oran, where he was arrested and charged with conspiracy against the French Republic for communications with Algerian freedom fighters.

After three weeks of arrest, Chabanne was sent to Madagascar at the time of the Algiers putsch of 1961. After his return from Madagascar, he was assigned to the 8th Infantry Division in Compiègne, led by General Goujon. After his leadership ended in 1974, he was assigned to the Caserne Lourcines in Paris. In 1975, he was named an advisor to President Omar Bongo. He remained in Gabon for two years before his assignment as Deputy Chief of Staff of the 2nd military region in Lille. He was appointed Général on 28 March 1981.

Raymond Chabanne died in Fontainebleau on 3 June 2022 at the age of 98.

Decorations
Grand Cross of the Legion of Honour (2017)

References

1924 births
2022 deaths
French military officers
Grand Croix of the Légion d'honneur
People from Clermont-Ferrand
French Resistance members